Illarion Illarionovich Vasilchikov (1805 – 12 November 1862) was an Imperial Russian general. He was the son of Illarion Vasilyevich Vasilchikov and Vera Vasilchikova. He was the father of Sergei Vasilchikov. One of his daughters married Alexander Meyendorf. He was a recipient of the Order of Saint Alexander Nevsky, the Order of Saint Anna, the Order of Saint Vladimir and the Order of the White Eagle (Russian Empire). He is buried at Kiev Pechersk Lavra in Ukraine.

References

External links 
 Военная биография
 Правление «доброго мальчика»

1805 births
1862 deaths
Hussars
Recipients of the Order of St. Anna, 1st class
Recipients of the Order of St. Vladimir, 2nd class
Recipients of the Order of the White Eagle (Russia)
Burials at Kyiv Pechersk Lavra